The Avenger monster truck, piloted by Columbus, Michigan native Jim Koehler, was created in 1997. The original monster truck sported a forest green Chevrolet S10 body style and a teal chassis and rims. With the exception of World Finals 14, the Avenger truck has always sported at least three flaming skulls (one on each side and one on the hood) and flowing flames running from the wheel wells. As time passed, the S10 body was replaced by a 1957 Chevrolet Bel-Air body with bright green headlights, which is the same body style that is run today by "Mr. Excitement."

Avenger is out of the Team Scream stable, which also features the Brutus, Mega-Bite, Spike, and Wrecking Crew monster trucks. The original Avenger chassis is currently run as Wrecking Crew by Steve Koehler, Jim's brother.

Body styles

Avenger and Jim Koehler is now the only truck and driver to compete in every Monster Jam World Finals. Tom Meents was the other to compete in all until missing World Finals 18 due to a back injury until he returned for the Monster Jam Path of Destruction Tour in Foxborough. The World Finals is the home to various versions of the Avenger truck, which are:

Forest Green Chevrolet S10
Forest Green 1957 Chevy Bel-Air (Won its first world freestyle title in 2003)
Orange Bel-Air (When he broke a transmission)
Half Forest Green and Half Orange Bel-Air
Chrome Bel-Air (Lawn Dart over the Volcano)
Toxic Green Bel-Air
Neon Green Bel-Air (When he broke a wheel off)
"Scuba" Light Blue Bel-Air (when he ended up in the doghouse after a single jump)
Black "Rat Rod" Bel-Air
Candy Apple Red "Las Vegas" Bel-Air (won its second world freestyle title)
Yellow "Two Time Champion" Bel-Air
"Garners" Apple Red Bel-Air (crashed in Thunder Alley in Racing Fixed for the final episode on SPEED at Monster Jam World Finals XIV Freestyle)
Fox Sports 1 Purple Bel-Air 
Garners Style White Bel-Air
Junkyard Blue Style Bel-Air
Dark Green "Celebrating 20 years" Chevy S10 with chrome logo (When he blew a tire after performing a backflip)
Lime Green Custom Nomad 
Red, Blue and White "Avengers" Bel-Air

Monster Jam World Finals accomplishments

Avenger has taken several titles over the years, but none shine brighter than his two Monster Jam World Finals Freestyle Championships. He won his first world championship title in 2003 with the original Forest Green Bel-Air and teal chassis, Jim shocked the Monster Jam World by being the first Freestyle Champion not named Dennis Anderson or Tom Meents. The following year in 2004 Koehler was stopped on him. He bent a 4-link bar that caused the transmission to break after he went over the cars, causing him to be frustrated. In March 2011, with his red "Las Vegas" Avenger, Jim tied with Cam McQueen in the Nitro Circus Monster Truck in the Freestyle competition, edging out McQueen to claim his second Freestyle title, making Jim Koehler one of only three drivers to have more than one Freestyle title at the World Finals, the others being Tom Meents and Adam Anderson (monster truck driver).

In 2009, Avenger went places that it had never ventured before with the debut of Aussie Avenger, built specifically for the Extreme Monster Trucks Australia tour. This truck featured a bright orange chassis as well as canary yellow rims, with a classic 1957 Chevy Bel-Air body. Jim traveled "Down Under" for the South Pacific Finals where he continued the tradition of American drivers bringing home the Australian championships with his Freestyle victory. In 2010, Jim returned to Brisbane for the South Pacific Finals 3 to defend his Freestyle Championship. "Mr. Excitement" held true to his name by taking a second straight championship in freestyle. In 2016, he is driving in the Fox Sports 1 Championship Series.

Awards

Monster Jam World Finals
 1999 (Motor Madness World Finals 0, Forest Green S-10)

Driver: Jim Koehler
 Racing: Lost to Bear Foot in Round 1
Freestyle: Scored 22

 2000 (Forest Green S-10)

Driver: Jim Koehler
 Racing: Lost to King Krunch in Round 1 
Freestyle: Scored 26 - Tied for seventh with Sudden Impact and Bulldozer

 2001 (Forest Green S-10)

Driver: Jim Koehler
 Racing: Beats Spider-Man in Round 1 due to a broken tire-rod
Freestyle: Scored 34 - Tied for fourth with Sting (Celebrating when he destroyed a mobile Home and Dennis Anderson says: "That was Awesome, Jim Koehler You Rock Buddy.)

 2002 (Forest Green Bel-Air)

Driver: Jim Koehler
 Racing: Lost to Sudden Impact in Round 1 
Freestyle: Scored 8 - Tied for last with Bulldozer

 2003 (Forest Green Bel-Air)

Driver: Jim Koehler
 Racing: Lost to Wolverine in Round 1 
Freestyle: Scored 37 -  First (won its first world title)

 2004 (Orange)

Driver: Jim Koehler
 Racing: Lost to Bounty Hunter in Round 1 
Freestyle: Scored 9 - Tied for last with Blue Thunder and Team Suzuki (broke its transmission by bending the fore-link bar when Scott Douglass says: "Oh My Goodness", This was wide open for jim to win the thing for a second straight year.

 2005 (Half Orange, Half Dark Green)

Driver: Jim Koehler
 Racing: Lost to Escalade in Round 1 (Behind the scenes: Fixing the Hot Wheels Truck)
Freestyle: Scored 25 - Tied for sixth with Scarlet Bandit and Escalade

 2006 (Chrome)

Driver: Jim Koehler
 Racing: Lost to El Toro Loco in Round 1
Freestyle: Scored 16 - Tied for sixteenth with Pastrana 199 (Lawn Dart over the Volcano on his third hit)

 2007 (Toxic Green)

Driver: Jim Koehler
 Racing: Lost to Brutus in Round 1 
Freestyle: Scored 20 - Tied for fifteenth with Pastrana 199

 2008 (Neon Green)

Driver: Jim Koehler
 Racing: Lost to Captain's Curse in Round 2
Freestyle: Scored 17 - Fourteenth (broke the right-front wheel off on his third hit)

 2009 (Light Blue)

Driver: Jim Koehler
 Racing: Lost to Brutus in Round 1
Freestyle: Scored 4 - Last

 2010 (Black and White)

Driver: Jim Koehler
 Racing: Lost to Grave Digger in Round 2
Freestyle: Scored 25 - Tied for tenth with Blue Thunder and Iron Man

 2011 (Candy Apple Red)

Driver: Jim Koehler
 Racing: Lost to Batman in Round 1
Freestyle: Scored 32 - Tied for first with Nitro Circus (won its second world title via a tiebreaker)

 2012 (Yellow)

Driver: Jim Koehler
Racing: Lost to Northern Nightmare in Round 1
Freestyle: Scored 13

 2013 (Garners' Apple Red)

Driver: Jim Koehler
Racing: Lost to Spider-Man in Round 1
Freestyle: Scored 23 - Tied for seventh with Zombie and Son-uva Digger

 2014 (Purple)

Driver: Jim Koehler
Racing: Lost to Max-D in Round 1
Freestyle: Scored 26.5 - Tied for eighth with Wolverine and Overkill Evolution

 2015 (White)

Driver: Jim Koehler
Racing: Lost to Neil Elliott's Max-D in Round 1
Freestyle: Scored 22 - Tied for thirteenth with Monster Mutt

 2016 (Rusty Blue)

Driver: Jim Koehler
Racing: Lost to Adam Anderson's Grave Digger in Round 1
Freestyle: Scored 12 - Last

 2017 (Dark Green Retro S-10)

Driver: Jim Koehler
Racing: Lost to Son-uva Digger in the Semi-Finals
Freestyle: Scored 9.240 - Third

 2018 (Lime Green Custom Bel-Air Wagon)

Driver: Jim Koehler
Racing: Lost to Tyler Menninga's Grave Digger in Round 1
Freestyle: Scored 2.990 - Last

 2019 (Red, Blue and White)

Driver: Jim Koehler
Racing: Lost to Great Clips Mohawk Warrior in Round 1
Freestyle: Scored 6.399 - Nineteenth

References

Monster trucks
Off-road vehicles
Sports entertainment
Vehicles introduced in 1997